is a Japanese anime television series created by Go Nagai. It was produced by Knack Productions and TV Tokyo. The anime is considered a mix of Genma Taisen, Mazinger and Gundam.

Story

The Garadain Empire has exhausted the primary resources of their native planet, so they send different space expeditions to find a new world where to live. One of their main objectives is planet Earth. However, Zeku Alba, an alien scientist, decides to rebel against the imperial rule and flees towards the Earth, where he gathers a group of children gifted with the power of "psychogenesis", an ability that consists of creating solid matter from psychic energy.

The most gifted of the squadron is Isamu, a young orphan whose family was killed in the first attack of the Garadain Empire. He is able to generate the powerful robot Govarian, an armor with which he can battle the alien monsters and is able to regenerate thanks to the psychic energy of the pilot. Helped by two other robots created by his teammates, Isamu, aboard the robot Govarian, defends the Earth in the long war against the alien invaders.

Characters

Mechas

Main mechas
Psycho Armor Govarian
Length: 13 meters
Weight: 47 tonnes
Pilot: Isamu Napoto

Length: 11 meters
Weight: 43 tonnes
Pilot: Kurt Buster, Hans Schultz (after the death of Buster)

Length: 11 meters
Weight: 63 tonnes
Pilot: Karim Atlas

Garadain mechas
: The basic flying infantry mecha.
: The basic walking infantry mecha.
: Mecha used by Meria
: Mecha used by Meria

: The most powerful mecha, controlled by Christo. Kurt Buster dies trying to destroy it. After Buster's attack, it's modified and later it is finally destroyed by Meria in a suicide attack.

Episodes

Source(s)

Production
The head of the main mecha of the series, Govarian, is similar to the head of Mazinger Z and Great Mazinger. This was done on purpose by Go Nagai and Dynamic Planning in accordance with the demand of production company Knack. In South Korea, it was presented as being part of the Mazinger series along with Groizer X. Other than that, Psycho Armor Govarian has no real relationship to any of the Mazinger series.

Staff
Airtime: Wednesday, 19:30-20:00 hrs.
Network: TV Tokyo
Production: TV Tokyo, Knack
Original work: Go Nagai, Dynamic Planning
Planning: Seiichi Nishino (Knack)
Producer: Hyota Ezu (TV Tokyo), Hirofumi Toida (Knack)
Series organization: Yoshihisa Araki
Series director: Seiji Okuda
Animation director: Gen Fukuda, Yuki Kinoshita
Script: Hideki Sonoda, Katsuhiko Taguchi, Yuji Watanabe, Tomomi Minahaya, Masato Nishio, Tsukasa Takahashi
Original character: Go Nagai
Character design: Gen Fukuda
Mechanic design: Sawaki Tateba
Art director: Morishige Suzuki
Photography director: Yoichi Shimizu
Music: Tatsumi Yano
Theme song performance: Neverland
Source(s)

Theme songs
Opening theme: , lyrics by Tomoaki Taka, composition by Shunji Inoe, arrangement by Neverland & Hiroki Harada (chorus), song by Tomoaki Taka.
Ending theme: , lyrics by Tomoaki Taka, composition by Shunji Inoe, arrangement by Neverland, song by Tomoaki Taka.
Insert song: , lyrics by Tomoaki Taka, composition by Shunji Inoe, arrangement by Tatsumi Yano, song by Tomoaki Taka. This theme is used in the last episode.
Insert song: , lyrics by Tomoaki Taka, composition by Shunji Inoe, arrangement by Tatsumi Yano, song by Tomoaki Taka.
"Lonely Journey" and "Lullaby" have been used in several music collections in arranged versions sung by Hironobu Kageyama.

Media

Home video
The series was released in VHS format during the 1980s in 6 volumes. In 2006-03-25 a DVD-box set containing the whole series was released by the company Japanese company BM3 with the standard number OHK-27.
During Otakon 2018 on August 12, Discotek Media announced a 1-disc SD on BD release of the entire series for a future release.

Picture books and manga
Besides the main TV series, two series of picture books were released, one by Shogakukan and the other by Asahi Sonorama.

Toys
Some toys and action figures based in the robots of the series were released, including several South Korean bootleg versions. The official figures were made by the company Poem.

Soundtracks
Four vinyl records were released during 1983 by King Records. The first one, an EP called Psycho Armor Govarian - Lonely Journey, contains the opening and ending theme, both of them performed by the Japanese group Neverland. The second EP, called Psycho Armor Govarian - It's LOVE, contains the themes "It's LOVE" and "Yuhi no Omoi". Also performed by Neverland, both themes have lyrics by Tomoaki Taka, composition by Shunji Inoe, arrangement by Tatsumi Yano and are sung by Tomoaki Taka. The last two are full LP album containing the BGM of the series and the opening and ending themes.

The opening and ending songs of the series are included in several CD compilations of anime series.

Appearances in other media
Besides its series related media, Govarian has appeared in other media. The most prominent is its appearance in the
 clips that were included at the end of the DVDs of Shin Getter Robot tai Neo Getter Robot. Govarian appears alongside Great Mazinger, Venus A, Getter Robot G, Kotetsu Jeeg, God Mazinger and Groizer X to rescue Mazinger Z and Aphrodite A, but are defeated and in turn saved by Shin Getter Robot and Grendizer just before the arrival of Mazinkaiser.

References

External links

Psycho Armor Govarian  at allcinema
Psycho Armor Govarian  at the Enciclo'Robopedia website

1983 anime television series debuts
Discotek Media
Go Nagai
Knack Productions
Mecha anime and manga
Shogakukan manga